It's Only a Movie is the seventh studio album by the British progressive rock band Family, released in 1973, and their last original studio album before they disbanded that year.

Track listing

All selections by Whitney and Chapman except "Check Out" by Whitney, Chapman and Cregan.

 Note: 2 track timings are incorrectly listed on the original LP label. "Boom Bang" is listed as 3:30 and "Check Out" as 4:45. Above timings are correct.

Personnel
Family
Roger Chapman - lead vocals
John "Charlie" Whitney - guitar, banjo
Tony Ashton - keyboards, backing vocals
Jim Cregan - bass
Rob Townsend - drums, percussion

Additional Personnel
Peter Hope-Evans - harmonica (2)
Del Newman - string and horn arrangements

References

1973 albums
Family (band) albums